Yashoda Reddy (5 August 1925 – 18 February 1983) was an Indian politician from Indian State of Andhra Pradesh. She was member of 3rd Lok Sabha from Kurnool during 1962–1967.

She was the member of Rajya Sabha from Andhra Pradesh during 1956–1962 and 1967–1972.

References

1925 births
1983 deaths
Rajya Sabha members from Andhra Pradesh
Lok Sabha members from Andhra Pradesh
India MPs 1962–1967
People from Kurnool district
Women members of the Lok Sabha
Women members of the Rajya Sabha
20th-century Indian women
20th-century Indian people